The Arenys de Munt query on Catalonia independence was a municipal non-binding query promoted by the Moviment Arenyenc per l'Autodeterminació (Arenyenc Movement for Self-determination) held in Arenys de Munt on 13 September 2009. The query was formulated exclusively for residents of this village on the following question: Està d'acord que Catalunya esdevingui un Estat de dret, independent, democràtic i social, integrat a la Unió Europea? (Do you agree on Catalonia becoming an independent, democratic and social State of law, integrated in the European Union?).

This query was the first democratic one on Catalonia independence and, despite being municipal and symbolic, had a remarkable influence on Catalan and Spanish politics.

Results

Reactions in the media
The query had wide media coverage all around the world and more than 300 journalists were granted to cover it by the organizers.

The New York Times (United States): Catalan Town Votes For Independence From Spain 
France Press (France): Espagne: vote massif pour l'indépendance catalane lors d'un référendum symbolique
Le Monde (France): La Catalogne se mobilise pour défendre son statut d'autonomie élargie
Ouest France (France): Une commune de Catalogne vote pour l'indépendance de la région
Nouvel Observateur (France): Vote massif en faveur de l'indépendance de la Catalogne
France24 (France): Espagne: référendum local controversé sur l'autodétermination catalane
n-TV (Germany): Katalanischer Ort gegen Spanien
Der Standard (Austria): Katalanische Gemeinde stimmte über Unabhängigkeit ab
CNN Türk (Turkey): Katalonya'nın bağımsızlığına referandum!
Milliyet (Turkey): Barcelona'da Katalonya için bağımsızlık gösterisi...
Expresso (Portugal): Espanha/Catalunha: Maioria de votantes em Arenys de Munt apoia independência em referendo com 41% de participação
NOS (Netherlands): Catalaans dorp wil los van Spanje
El Mundo (Spain): Sí masivo en la consulta independentista, que tuvo un 41% de participación
STV (Great Britain): Catalan town votes for independence from Spain
ORF (Austria): Katalanisches Dorf stimmt für die Unabhängigkeit
7sur7 (Belgium): Référendum polémique sur l'autodétermination de la Catalogne
El Universal (Venezuela): Realizan en España consulta no vinculante por la independencia de Cataluña
Euronews (Europe): Catalan town votes for independence
El País (Spain): Convergència y ERC llaman an extender el alarde soberanista de Arenys
De Morgen (Flandes): Catalaanse gemeente stemt over onafhankelijkheid

See also
 Catalan separatism
 Independence referendum
 Query on Catalonia independence
 Institut Nova Història

External links
 Official website

References

Catalan independence movement
Politics of Catalonia
Catalonia
Catalonia
2009 in Catalonia
Catalonia
Referendums in Catalonia
Articles containing video clips